Time Lapse is the first live album by guitarist Steve Hackett.  The album is drawn from live performances at the Savoy Theatre in New York City (during the Cured tour) and at Central TV Studios in Nottingham. Chas Cronk of the Strawbs plays bass on the songs recorded in New York, as well as future Marillion drummer, Ian Mosley.

Track listing
All songs written by Steve Hackett, except where indicated.
"Camino Royale" (Hackett, Nick Magnus) – 7:33
"Please Don't Touch" – 4:24
"Every Day" – 6:59
"In That Quiet Earth" (Tony Banks, Phil Collins, Hackett, Mike Rutherford) – 3:50
"Depth Charge" – 3:21
"Jacuzzi" – 4:29
"The Steppes" – 5:57
"Ace of Wands" – 7:36
"Hope I Don't Wake" – 4:13
"The Red Flower of Tachai Blooms Everywhere" – 2:44
"Tigermoth" – 3:22
"A Tower Struck Down" (Steve Hackett, John Hackett) – 2:58
"Spectral Mornings" – 5:19
"Clocks" – 4:52

Personnel
Steve Hackett – guitar, vocals
John Hackett – flute, guitar, bass pedals

Nottingham
Ian Ellis – bass, vocals
Julian Colbeck – keyboards, vocals
Fudge Smith – drums

New York City
Chas Cronk – bass, vocals
Nick Magnus – keyboards
Ian Mosley – drums

Tracks 1–5, 13–14 recorded at Central TV Studios, Nottingham, October 1990

Tracks 6–12 recorded at the Savoy Theatre, New York, November 1981

References

Steve Hackett albums
1991 live albums